Brazil competed at the 2000 Summer Olympics in Sydney, Australia.
Brazilian athletes won twelve medals: six silver and six bronze, in the first Summer Olympics edition without a gold medal since the 1976 Summer Olympics. The 205 competitors, 111 men and 94 women, took part in 96 events in 23 sports.

Summary
At the Judo competitions, two silver medals were obtained. Tiago Camilo lost in the final against Italian Giuseppe Maddaloni in men's 73 kg. Carlos Honorato lost the final of the men's 90 kg to Mark Huizinga from the Netherlands.

Brazilians sailors conquered two medals in Sailing. Current Olympic champion Robert Scheidt was silver medalist in the Laser class after a very tough competition against British gold medalist Ben Ainslie. The 1996 Olympic champions Torben Grael and Marcelo Ferreira were bronze medalists in Star class. It was Grael's fourth of five Olympic medals.

Brazil obtained four of those medals in Volleyball (three of them in beach volleyball and one indoor). Adriana Behar and Shelda Bede were silver medalists in Women's beach volleyball. They were current world champions and lost the gold medal match to Natalie Cook and Kerri Pottharst from Australia. Also in the women's competition, Brazilians Adriana Samuel and Sandra Pires were the bronze medalists. Zé Marco de Melo and Ricardo Santos were silver medalists of the men's beach volleyball competition losing the gold medal match to Americans Dain Blanton and Eric Fonoimoana.  The indoor medal was the bronze conquered by Brazil women's national volleyball team, repeating the same result of the 1996 Summer Olympics, in a match of 3 sets to 0 against United States.

The bronze medal obtained by equestrians Luiz Felipe de Azevedo, André Johannpeter, Alvaro Miranda Neto and Rodrigo Pessoa in team jumping was the same result of the 1996 Olympics and with the same team.

The swimmers Fernando Scherer, Gustavo Borges, Carlos Jayme and Edvaldo Valério conquered the bronze medal in men's 4 × 100 metre freestyle relay. It was Gustavo Borges' fourth Olympic medal, a record number among Brazilian swimmers.

Brazil women's national basketball team won the bronze medal in a match decided in extra-time against South Korea.

At the Athletics competition a silver medal was obtained in men's 4 × 100 metres relay, by sprinters Vicente de Lima, Édson Ribeiro, André da Silva and Claudinei da Silva. Cláudio Roberto Souza was also awarded a silver medal in the event because he took part in the relay in the heats.

Medalists

| width=78% align=left valign=top |

|  style="text-align:left; width:22%; vertical-align:top;"|

Athletics

Key
Note–Ranks given for track events are within the athlete's heat only
Q = Qualified for the next round
q = Qualified for the next round as a fastest loser or, in field events, by position without achieving the qualifying target
NR = National record
N/A = Round not applicable for the event
Bye = Athlete not required to compete in round

Men
Track and road events

Field events

Women
Field events

Basketball

Women's tournament

Team roster
Adriana Aparecida dos Santos
Adrianinha
Alessandra Santos de Oliveira
Cíntia Tuiú
Claudinha
Helen Cristina Santos Luz
Zaine
Janeth dos Santos Arcain
Kelly da Silva Santos
Lílian Cristina Lopes Gonçalves
Marta de Souza Sobral
Silvinha

Group play

Quarterfinal

Semifinal

Bronze medal match

Boxing

Canoeing

Slalom

Sprint 
Men

Cycling

Road

Men

Women

Mountain biking

Diving

Men

Women

Equestrianism

Dressage

Eventing

Jumping

Fencing

One male fencer represented Brazil in 2000.

Men

Football

Summary

Men's tournament

Roster
Head coach: Vanderlei Luxemburgo

Stand-by players

Group play

Quarterfinal

Women's tournament

Head coach: José Duarte

Brazil named a squad of 18 players and 4 alternates for the tournament.

Group play

Semifinal

Bronze medal match

Gymnastics

Artistic

Women

Rhythmic

Handball

Summary

Team roster
 Alessandra Medeiros da Oliveira
 Aline Silva
 Chana Masson
 Dilane Roese
 Idalina Mesquita
 Lucila Vianna da Silva
 Meg Montão
 Margarida Conte
 Maria José Batista de Sales
 Rosana de Aleluia
 Sandra de Oliveira
 Valéria de Oliveira
 Viviane Jacques
 Viviani Emerick

Group play

Quarterfinal

5th-8th place classification match

7th place match

Judo

Rowing

Sailing

Nine men and three women competed in the eight events in the Sailing competition in Sydney.

Men's Mistral
Ricardo Santos
 Race 1 – 5
 Race 2 – 10
 Race 3 – 21
 Race 4 – 12
 Race 5 – 22
 Race 6 – 4
 Race 7 – 8
 Race 8 – 14
 Race 9 – (37) OCS
 Race 10 – 21
 Race 11 – 26
 Final – 117 (15th place)

Men's single-handed dinghy (Finn)
Christoph Bergmann
 Race 1 – 10
 Race 2 – 8
 Race 3 – 3
 Race 4 – (21)
 Race 5 – 11
 Race 6 – 13
 Race 7 – 9
 Race 8 – 2
 Race 9 – 18
 Race 10 – (20) 
 Race 11 – 10
 Final – 84 (11th place)

Men's double-handed dinghy (470)
Andre Fonseca and Alexandre Paradeda
 Race 1 – 14
 Race 2 – (24)
 Race 3 – 11
 Race 4 – 21
 Race 5 – 15
 Race 6 – 20
 Race 7 – (27)
 Race 8 – 24
 Race 9 – 22
 Race 10 – 21
 Race 11 – 23
 Final – 171 (26th place)

Men's Laser
Robert Scheidt
 Race 1 – 1
 Race 2 – 2
 Race 3 – (22)
 Race 4 – 1
 Race 5 – 12
 Race 6 – 1
 Race 7 – 20
 Race 8 – 5
 Race 9 – 1
 Race 10 – 1
 Race 11 – (44) DSQ
 Final – 44 (silver medal)

Men's Tornado
Henrique Pellicano and Mauricio Oliveira
 Race 1 – (17) OCS
 Race 2 – 7
 Race 3 – 6
 Race 4 – 9
 Race 5 – 16
 Race 6 – 13
 Race 7 – (17) OCS
 Race 8 – 5
 Race 9 – 6
 Race 10 – 5
 Race 11 – 11
 Final – 78 (11th place)

Men's two-handed keelboat (Star)
Marcelo Ferreira and Torben Grael
 Race 1 – 3
 Race 2 – (13)
 Race 3 – 1
 Race 4 – 2
 Race 5 – 1
 Race 6 – 6
 Race 7 – 7
 Race 8 – 4
 Race 9 – 12
 Race 10 – 3
 Race 11 – (17) OCS
 Final – 39 (bronze medal)

Women's Mistral
Christina Forte
 Race 1 – 24
 Race 2 – 22
 Race 3 – (27)
 Race 4 – 26
 Race 5 – 24
 Race 6 – (30) OCS
 Race 7 – 26
 Race 8 – 25
 Race 9 – 24
 Race 10 – 25
 Race 11 – 27
 Final – 223 (26th place)

Women's double-handed dinghy (470)
Maria Krahe and Fernanda Oliveira
 Race 1 – 16
 Race 2 – 17
 Race 3 – 14
 Race 4 – 14
 Race 5 – 13
 Race 6 – (20) DSQ
 Race 7 – 17
 Race 8 – 15
 Race 9 – (20) OCS
 Race 10 – 19
 Race 11 – 18
 Final – 143 (19th place)

Swimming

Men's 50m freestyle
Fernando Scherer
 Preliminary heat – 22.88 (did not advance) 
Edvaldo Valério
 Preliminary heat – 22.96 (did not advance)

Men's 100m freestyle
Fernando Scherer
 Preliminary heat – DNS (did not advance) 
Gustavo Borges
 Preliminary heat – 49.76
 Semi-final – 49.93 (did not advance)

Men's 200m freestyle
Rodrigo Castro
 Preliminary heat – 1:53.65 (did not advance)

Men's 400m freestyle
Luiz Lima
 Preliminary heat – 03:53.87 (did not advance)

Men's 1500m freestyle
Luiz Lima
 Preliminary heat – 15:23.15 (did not advance)

Men's 100m breaststroke
Eduardo Fischer
 Preliminary heat – 01:03.72 (did not advance)

Men's 100m backstroke
Alexandre Massura
 Preliminary heat – 55.58
 Semi-final – 56.07 (did not advance)
Rogério Romero
 Preliminary heat – 56.44 (did not advance)

Men's 200m backstroke
Rogério Romero
 Preliminary heat – 02:00.48
 Semi-final – 01:59.69
 Final – 01:59.27 (7th place) 
Leonardo Costa
 Preliminary heat – 02:01.08
 Semi-final – 02:02.26 (did not advance)

Men's 4 × 100 m freestyle
Fernando Scherer, Edvaldo Valério, Carlos Jayme, Gustavo Borges
 Preliminary heat – 03:19.29
 Final – 03:17.40 (bronze medal)

Men's 4 × 200 m freestyle
Edvaldo Valério, Leonardo Costa, Luiz Lima, Rodrigo Castro
 Preliminary heat – 07:26.42 (did not advance)

Men's 4 × 100 m medley
Alexandre Massura, Eduardo Fischer, Fernando Scherer, Gustavo Borges
 Preliminary heat – 03:42.31 (did not advance)

Women's 100m butterfly
Fabíola Molina
 Preliminary heat – 01:02.77 (did not advance)

Women's 100m backstroke
Fabíola Molina
 Preliminary heat – 01:03.68 (did not advance)

Synchronized swimming

Women

Table tennis

Taekwondo

Tennis

Triathlon

At the inaugural Olympic triathlon competition, Brazil was represented by three men and three women. Two of the Brazilian women did not finish, giving Brazil the distinction of being one of only two nations (along with Great Britain) to have multiple competitors not finish the race.

Men's individual competition:
Leandro Macedo – 1:49:50.69 (→ 14th place)
Juraci Moreira – 1:50:44.79 (→ 22nd place)
Armando Barcellos – 1:53:42.63 (→ 39th place)

Women's individual competition:
Sandra Soldan – 2:03:19.86 (→ 11th place)
Mariana Ohata – DNF (→ no ranking)
Carla Moreno – DNF (→ no ranking)

Volleyball

Men's team competition
Preliminary round (group A)
Defeated Australia (3–0)
Defeated Egypt (3–0)
Defeated Netherlands (3–0)
Defeated Spain (3–1)
Defeated Cuba (3–0)
Quarterfinals
Lost to Argentina (1–3)
Classification matches
5th/8th place: defeated Cuba (3–2)
5th/6th place: lost to Netherlands (0–3) → sixth place
Team roster
André Heller
Dante Amaral
Douglas Chiarotti
Gilberto Godoy Filho
Giovane Gávio
Gustavo Endres
Gilmar Teixeira
Marcelo Elgarten
Maurício Lima
Max Pereira
Nalbert Bitencourt
Alexandre Samuel
Head coach: Radamés Lattari Filho

Women's team competition
Preliminary round (group A)
Defeated Kenya (3–0)
Defeated Australia (3–0)
Defeated PR China (3–0)
Defeated Croatia (3–0)
Defeated United States (3–1)
Quarterfinals
Defeated Germany (3–0)
Semifinals
Lost to Cuba (2–3)
Bronze-medal match
Defeated United States (3–0) →  bronze medal
Team roster
Elisângela Oliveira
Erika Coimbra
Hélia Souza
Janina Conceição 
Karin Rodrigues
Kátia Lopes
Kely Fraga
Leila Barros
Raquel Silva
Ricarda Lima
Virna Dias
Walewska Oliveira
Head coach: Bernardo Rezende

Weightlifting

See also
Brazil at the 1999 Pan American Games

Notes

Wallechinsky, David (2004). The Complete Book of the Summer Olympics (Athens 2004 Edition). Toronto, Canada. . 
International Olympic Committee (2001). The Results. Retrieved 12 November 2005.
Sydney Organising Committee for the Olympic Games (2001). Official Report of the XXVII Olympiad Volume 1: Preparing for the Games. Retrieved 20 November 2005.
Sydney Organising Committee for the Olympic Games (2001). Official Report of the XXVII Olympiad Volume 2: Celebrating the Games. Retrieved 20 November 2005.
Sydney Organising Committee for the Olympic Games (2001). The Results. Retrieved 20 November 2005.
International Olympic Committee Web Site

References

Nations at the 2000 Summer Olympics
2000 Summer Olympics
Summer Olympics